Hammam Debagh is a town and commune in Guelma Province, Algeria. It is the district seat of Hammam Debagh District and the location of the famous Hammam Maskhoutine thermal complex.

References

Communes of Guelma Province
Guelma Province